Industrial High School is a former high school located at 800 11th St., West Palm Beach, Florida. The building is currently used by U. B. Kinsey/Palmview Elementary School. It opened in 1914 as the first high school for African Americans in Palm Beach County; the last class graduated in 1950, when a new school for African Americans, Roosevelt Junior-Senior High School, opened. It was the "center of attention" for the black community "that straddled Tamarind Avenue." (See Northwest Historic District.)

References

Buildings and structures in West Palm Beach, Florida
Historically segregated African-American schools in Florida
1914 establishments in Florida
1950 disestablishments in Florida
Defunct public schools in Palm Beach County, Florida
Defunct black public schools in the United States that closed when schools were integrated
Defunct public high schools in Florida